Brian William Manley  FCGI (30 June 1929 – 20 December 2014) was a UK physicist and engineer. He served as president of the Institution of Electrical Engineers in 1991 and was president of the Institute of Physics from 1996-1998.

External links
 Brian Manley – obituary. In: The Daily Telegraph, 1 March 2015

References

1929 births
2014 deaths
Presidents of the Institute of Physics
British physicists
Commanders of the Order of the British Empire
Fellows of the Royal Academy of Engineering